The 1934 Sam Houston State Bearkats football team represented Sam Houston State Teachers College (now known as Sam Houston State University) as a member of the Lone Star Conference (LSC)  during the 1934 college football season. Led by 12th-year head coach J. W. Jones, the Bearkats compiled an overall record of 3–4–2 with a mark of 2–2 in conference play, and finished tied for second in the LSC.

Schedule

References

Sam Houston State
Sam Houston Bearkats football seasons
Sam Houston State Bearkats football